Deborah Louise Kotulich is a United States Army major general who serves as director of the Army Recruiting and Retention Task Force since October 2022. She most recently served as the chief of staff of The Naming Commission from November 2021 to its dissolution in October 2022, and as chief of staff of the United States Transportation Command from 2019 to 2021. Previously, she served as commander of the 143rd Sustainment Command (Expeditionary).

Kotulich is a 1990 graduate of the United States Military Academy with a Bachelor of Science degree in engineering. She later earned a Master of Science degree in national resource strategy from the Eisenhower School at the National Defense University.

References

Dwight D. Eisenhower School for National Security and Resource Strategy alumni
Living people
Place of birth missing (living people)
Recipients of the Legion of Merit
United States Army generals
United States Army personnel of the Iraq War
United States Army personnel of the War in Afghanistan (2001–2021)
United States Military Academy alumni
Year of birth missing (living people)